The Home Islands are an island group located in the Coronation Gulf, south of Victoria Island, in the Kitikmeot Region, Nunavut, Canada.

Other island groups in the vicinity include the Akvitlak Islands, Berens Islands, Black Berry Islands, Couper Islands, Lawford Islands, Leo Islands, and Sir Graham Moore Islands.

References

Islands of Coronation Gulf
Uninhabited islands of Kitikmeot Region